The 2020 Canada Sevens was a rugby sevens tournament held at BC Place in Vancouver on 7–8 March 2020. The tournament was the seventh event of the 2019–20 Sevens World Series for men's teams, and the fifth edition of the Canada Sevens.

Format
The sixteen are drawn into four pools of four teams. Each team plays every other team in their pool once. The top two teams from each pool advance to the Cup playoffs and compete for gold, silver and bronze medals. The other teams from each pool go to the classification playoffs for ninth to sixteenth placings.

Teams
Fifteen core teams played in the tournament along with one invitational team, Japan.

Pool stage
All times in Pacific Standard Time (UTC−08:00). The pools were scheduled as follows:

Key:  Team advanced to the quarterfinals

Pool A

Pool B

Pool C

Pool D

Knockout stage

Thirteenth place

Ninth place

Fifth place

Cup

Tournament placings

References

External links
Tournament page
World Rugby page

2020
Canada Sevens 2020
Canada Sevens
Canada Sevens
Canada Sevens
Canada Sevens